Karolina Sparnauskaitė (born 26 August 1999) is a Lithuanian handball player who currently plays for Lithuanian club HC SM Garliava and the Lithuania national team.

Awards 
 2020 Lithuanian Female Handball Player of the Year

References

Lithuanian female handball players
Living people
1999 births